The Endless Summer is a mixtape by American rapper G-Eazy. The mixtape was released on August 12, 2011. The release of The Endless Summer saw G-Eazy achieve his first notable success, with the mixtape being nominated for Best Rap/Hip-Hop Album or Mixtape 2011. The mixtape includes guest appearances from Nas, Drake, Nate Dogg & Mariah Carey.

Release
Concerning distribution, the mixtape was released free via a number of sites. G-Eazy explained his decision in doing this in an interview with Earmilk in August 2011, "I just give it all away for free. I find it reaches more people that way. I understand that this new business model scares some people, including the major labels, but that's because they haven't quite figured out how to adapt yet."

Critical reception
The Endless Summer was well received by critics and the public. On djbooth.net The Endless Summer has an average score of 4.7 out of 5 and several other good reviews on websites such as barryfest.com.

Track listing

References

External links
 G-Eazy - The Endless Summer (2011, CDr) by Discogs
 The Endless Summer (2011, CDr) by music

2011 mixtape albums